Jennifer Otter Bickerdike is an American media and music academic and author, specializing in fandom, vinyl records, the cult of dead celebrity, pop culture and music. She has written and presented extensively on fandom and media across various platforms, including the BBC, Channel 4, TruTV, The Guardian and Playboy.

Music experience and early academic career 
Otter Bickerdike was raised in Santa Cruz, California, where she established an interest for the ocean, conservation, swimming, surfing and music. While working to complete her BA in American Studies at the University of California, Davis, Otter Bickerdike landed her first position in the music industry, with a College Music Representative job at Sony Music Entertainment. Before graduating, she interned at a variety of record companies, including PolyGram, MCA Records and Universal Music Distribution before becoming the West Coast Marketing Director for Interscope Geffen A&M Records at 25. She toured with and devised marketing and branding campaigns for acts including Nirvana, Pearl Jam, Rage Against the Machine, Dr. Dre, Gwen Stefani, U2 and Eminem, before leaving to start her own consulting company, working with a wide array of creative and technology industry, such as Facebook, Music for America, Fuzz, Adeline Records and L.A.M.B.  She concurrently taught at and gained her MA in Humanities from San Francisco State University.

After friend Hunter McPherson was murdered in San Francisco, Otter Bickerdike decided to leave her job, sell everything she owned and move to England.

After moving to London, Otter Bickerdike enrolled in Goldsmiths, University of London, where she completed her PhD in Cultural Studies. Otter Bickerdike's doctorate focused on the evolving fandom and mythology of post-punk band Joy Division and Seattle icons Nirvana.

Otter Bickerdike is currently the creator and host of the Rock and Roll Confidential podcast as well as a co-founder of Moving the Needle, a non-profit organization created to support women in the UK music industry through their entire career.

Publications 
Otter Bickerdike specializes in writing about popular culture and fandom. Her books include:

 Being Britney: Pieces of a Modern Icon (Bonnier / Nine Eight) {{|9781788705240}}
 You Are Beautiful and You Are Alone: The Biography of Nico  (Faber & Faber / Hachette, 2021)
 Why Vinyl Matters: A Manifesto from Musicians and Fans (ACC Art Books) 
 Joy Devotion: The Importance of Ian Curtis and Fan Culture (Monograph, 2016) Headpress, 
 The Secular Religion of Fandom (Sage, 2015)
 Fandom, Image and Authenticity:  Joy Devotion and the Second Lives of Kurt Cobain and Ian Curtis (Palgrave MacMillan, 2014) 

Otter Bickerdike is the editor of Will Sergeant of Echo and the Bunnymen's book Bunnyman (Hachette / Third Man, 2021) and a book about Iggy Pop, Iggy & the Stooges: One Night at the Whisky 1970, featuring the photography of Ed Caraeff.

Media appearances and awards 
Otter Bickerdike has spoken at institutions including Google, Liverpool Sound City, Manchester Off The Record, Bestival, Goldsmiths University of London, Cambridge University, Experience Music Project Seattle, San Francisco's Noise Pop Festival, XOYO, The Battery and others, on areas including the rise of celebrity culture, the tragic gothic heroine, and dark tourism. She has appeared as an expert on pop music and media across media such as BBC 1, BBC Radio 6, Channel 4, BBC 3 and TruTV, and has written for The Guardian (newspaper), Louder Than War, Long Live Vinyl, Bass Guitar and Playboy.

In 2019, Otter Bickerdike was featured on the cover of the Good Times. In September of the same year, Santa Cruz mayor Martine Watkins proclaimed September 28 officially 'Jennifer Otter Bickerdike' day in honor of Otter Bickerdike's contributions to music culture and community in her hometown.

In 2013, she won the Student Led Teaching award for Most Innovative Lecturer and was short listed for the same accolade on a national level by the Times Higher Education.

References

External links

Living people
Year of birth missing (living people)
American non-fiction writers
University of California, Davis alumni
Alumni of Goldsmiths, University of London
Place of birth missing (living people)